Rosedale is an unincorporated community in Defiance County, in the U.S. state of Ohio.

The GNIS classifies Rosedale as a populated place. However, Rosedale was described as a ghost town by the Toledo Blade as little remains of the original community.

References

Unincorporated communities in Defiance County, Ohio
Unincorporated communities in Ohio